Gota’s War: The Crushing of Tamil Tiger Terrorism in Sri Lanka is book written by a Sri Lankan Journalist C A Chandraprema of Divaina newspaper about the role of Gotabhaya Rajapaksa in ending the Sri Lankan Civil War

References

2012 non-fiction books
Sri Lankan Civil War books